Coleophora hypomona is a moth of the family Coleophoridae. It is found in Turkestan and Uzbekistan.

References

hypomona
Moths described in 1979
Moths of Asia